A fingerplate is a plate that is fixed to a door near the handle or keyhole. It can be made of metal, plastic, ceramic or glass. Its purpose is to prevent people's fingers from smudging the door.

Door furniture